Lembit Rajala (born 1 December 1970) is a former Estonian professional footballer. He was playing the position of striker. He won a total of 26 international caps for the Estonia national football team.

References

1970 births
Living people
Estonian footballers
Soviet footballers
Footballers from Tallinn
Estonia international footballers
Meistriliiga players
Veikkausliiga players
Viljandi JK Tulevik players
FC Flora players
FC Norma Tallinn players
IFK Mariehamn players
Estonian expatriate footballers
Expatriate footballers in Finland
Estonian expatriate sportspeople in Finland
Kotkan Työväen Palloilijat players
Association football forwards